Kalliope (Greek: Καλλιόπη) was an Indo-Greek queen and wife of Hermaeus, who was a Western Indo-Greek king of the Eucratid Dynasty. He ruled the territory of Paropamisade in the Hindu-Kush region, with his capital in Alexandria of the Caucasus (near today's Kabul, Afghanistan). Their reign dates from the first quarter of the first century BC.

Coinage 
Kalliope and Hermaeus jointly issued silver, Indian-Standard Drachms. The obverse featured diademed and draped busts of them both. The reverse shows the king on a prancing horse, which is characteristic motif of the contemporary Greek kings in the eastern Punjab such as Hippostratos. It has been suggested that the coin represented a marital alliance between the two dynastic lines. Coins have been found in Peshawar and near Mohmand. They were also part of the assemblage of the Sarai Saleh hoard and 928 were found in the first Mir Zakah deposit. Some of these coins are found overstruck with dies in the name of Artemidoros. The depiction of the wife on Indo-Greek coins is otherwise not common, so that it can be assumed that Calliope played a special role (perhaps in the marriage policy of the Indo-Greek states).

Historiography 
Whilst Kalliope has been referred to as Hermaeus' wife by W W Tarn and A K Narain, S K Dikshit suggested that Kalliope appeared older in her portrait and as such perhaps was Hermaeus' mother.

References 

1st-century BC women
Indo-Greeks
Year of birth unknown
Year of death unknown
Ancient queens consort